James Goodrich may refer to:

 James F. Goodrich (1913–2012), United States Under Secretary of the Navy
 James Goodrich (Royal Navy officer) (1851–1925), British admiral
 James P. Goodrich (1864–1940), Governor of Indiana
 James T. Goodrich (1946–2020), American neurosurgeon
 Jimmy Goodrich, American boxer